Stróże  is a village, located in southern Poland, in the Nowy Sącz County of the Lesser Poland Voivodeship. Situated some 4 kilometres north of Grybów, Stróże is an important railroad junction, with lines going into three directions - northwards to Tarnów, westwards to Nowy Sącz and eastwards to Gorlice. 

Stróże has a population of 3,500. The village is famous for its Museum of Apiculture. 
The domestic football team is Kolejarz Stróże.

References

Villages in Nowy Sącz County